High Rocks railway station is a station on the Spa Valley Railway in High Rocks, East Sussex, England.

The original High Rocks Halt opened on 1 June 1907, as part of a London, Brighton and South Coast Railway scheme to boost traffic on its lines. It finally closed on 5 May 1952 due to low traffic (it had been closed from 16 October 1939 to 15 June 1942 as a wartime economy measure). The rest of the line soldiered on with ever-decreasing services, to be finally closed to all traffic on 10 August 1985. The line through the station site was re-opened by the Spa Valley Railway in 1997. The new High Rocks station opened in August 1998, having been built about 100 yards west of the original halt closed in 1952.

References 

Heritage railway stations in East Sussex
Former London, Brighton and South Coast Railway stations
Railway stations in Great Britain opened in 1907
Railway stations in Great Britain closed in 1939
Railway stations in Great Britain opened in 1942
Railway stations in Great Britain closed in 1952
Railway stations in Great Britain opened in 1998
Railway stations built for UK heritage railways
1907 establishments in England
Wealden District